Hayward H. Plumadore (July 13, 1913 – July 30, 2001) was an American politician who served in the New York State Assembly from the Franklin district from 1960 to 1964.

References

1913 births
2001 deaths
Republican Party members of the New York State Assembly
20th-century American politicians